Charitosaurus is an extinct genus of pachypleurosaur.

See also

 List of plesiosaurs

References

Pachypleurosaurs